Natural High is the second album by the soul group Bloodstone, released in 1973. It was reissued on CD in 1996 with several bonus tracks.

The album charted at number two on the Soul Album Charts, led by single "Natural High", which charted at number four on the Soul Singles chart and number ten on the Pop chart. 

The title song was used by Quentin Tarantino on the soundtrack to his movie Jackie Brown.

Track listing
"You Know We've Learned" - (Willis Draffen Jr.) - 4:12
"Who Has the Last Laugh Now" - (Charles McCormick) - 5:36
"Peter's Jones" - (Larry Durham, Roger Durham) - 4:12
"That's the Way We Make Our Music" - (Eddie Summers) - 3:15
"Bo Diddley/Diddley Daddy" - (Ellis McDaniel) - 3:37
"Natural High" (McCormick) - 4:53
"I Need Your Love" - (McCormick) - 1:10
"Tell It to My Face" - (Charles Love) - 3:15
"Ran It in the Ground" - (Love) - 4:52
"Never Let You Go" - (Harry Williams) - 5:37

Bonus tracks on CD reissue:
"Girl (You Look So Fine)" - 2:38
"Judy, Judy" - 2:44
"Sadie Mae" - 3:02
"Take These Chains" - 2:55
"You Don't Mean Nothin'" - 3:39
"Little Green Apples" - 9:14

Personnel
Charles McCormick - bass, vocals
Charles Love, Willis Draffen Jr. - guitar, vocals
Melvin Webb - drums, congas, timbales
Roger Durham, Harry Williams - percussion, vocals
Hense Powell - piano, electric piano, organ
Eddie Summers - drums, vibraphone, piano, congas, vocals
Gordon Dewitte - organ
Mike Vernon - glockenspiel, castanets, tubular bells
Richard L. Mackey, Arthur N. Maebe - French horn
Jacqueline Lustgarten, Raymond L. Kelley - cello
Gene Cipriano - cor Anglais
Dan Neufeld, Nathan Kaproff - viola
Carla Spencer, Erno Neufeld, Paul C. Shure, Samuel Boghossian - violin
Pip Williams - arranger, conductor

Charts

Singles

References

External links
 Bloodstone-Natural High at Discogs

1973 albums
Bloodstone (band) albums
London Records albums
Albums produced by Mike Vernon (record producer)